Carex acuta,  the acute sedge, slender tufted-sedge, or slim sedge, can be found growing on the margins of rivers and lakes in the Palaearctic terrestrial ecoregions in beds of wet, alkaline or slightly acid depressions with mineral soil.

Carex acuta does not tolerate prolonged desiccation. The community is distributed, in particular, in northern France, the Low Countries, Central Europe south to the Sava and Drava valleys of Croatia, the northern Morava valley of Serbia and Romania, north to Poland, the Kaliningrad District, Lithuania and Latvia, in southern Scandinavia, in the Dnieper basin of northern Ukraine and southern Belarus, in the lower Volga Valley.

References

External links

acuta
Flora of Asia
Flora of Europe
Flora of North Africa
Plants described in 1753
Taxa named by Carl Linnaeus